Pyrenowilmsia is a genus of lichenized fungi in the family Pyrenulaceae. It is a monotypic genus, containing the single species Pyrenowilmsia ferruginosa.

References

 
 

Monotypic Eurotiomycetes genera
Lichen genera
Pyrenulales
Taxa described in 1991
Taxa named by André Aptroot